Dobrivoje Trivić (26 October 1943 – 26 February 2013) was a Serbian defender who played for SFR Yugoslavia.

References

External links
 Profile on Serbian federation site

1943 births
2013 deaths
Sportspeople from Šabac
Serbian footballers
Yugoslav footballers
Yugoslav expatriate footballers
Yugoslavia international footballers
Association football defenders
Yugoslav First League players
FK Srem players
FK Vojvodina players
Ligue 1 players
Ligue 2 players
Olympique Lyonnais players
Toulouse FC players
UEFA Euro 1968 players
Serbian expatriate footballers
Expatriate footballers in France
FK Bačka 1901 managers